Autumnal equinox or variations, may refer to:

 September equinox, the autumnal equinox in the Northern Hemisphere
 March equinox, the autumnal equinox in the Southern Hemisphere

Other uses
 Autumnal Equinox Day (Japanese: 秋分の日, Shūbun no Hi), a public holiday in September in Japan
 Autumn Equinox: Amethyst Deceivers, a 1998 record by Coil

See also

 Equinox (disambiguation)
 Autumn (disambiguation)
 Winter solstice (disambiguation)
 Summer solstice (disambiguation)
 Spring equinox (disambiguation)